Jay Chanoine is a stand-up comedian from Manchester, New Hampshire. He has released two albums, most recently 2019's The Texas Chanoinesaw Massacre, produced by Grammy winner Dan Schlissel for Stand Up! Records. It reached No. 1 on the Amazon comedy chart.

Career
Chanoine started performing stand-up comedy in 2009. He was recognized by New Hampshire Public Radio's Word of Mouth program as one of the top comics in the state, saying that  "Jay has loads of talent. He's funny. He's got personality. And there's that feeling he might make something of this." New Hampshire weekly The Hippo called his comedy "edgy" and noted that Chanoine's favorite topics included "alt rock, Teenage Mutant Ninja Turtles and his ability to fit into his wife’s clothes." He is featured in director Lisa Romagnoli's 2013 documentary Wicked Funny 2, an exploration of the New Hampshire comedy scene.

Chanoine has toured frequently with Austin, Texas comic JT Habersaat, and performed with Kyle Kinane, Myq Kaplan and Sam Jay.

He is a contributing writer for satirical website The Hard Times.

Albums
Chanoine self-released his first album Come On Feel Chanoine  in 2015, whose title puns off of the Slade/Quiet Riot song "Cum On Feel the Noize."

His 2019 followup album The Texas Chanoinesaw Massacre was released by Stand Up! Records. Reviewer Richard Lanoie of the Serious Comedy Site called it "surreal but very, very believable. Also excellent." He wrote that, "At a time when biographical stand-up comedy seems generally banal at best, Jay Chanoine’s material stands out for how well it is written and how different it is."

Discography
Come On Feel Chanoine (Self-released, 2015)
The Texas Chanoinesaw Massacre (Stand Up! Records, 2019)

References

External links
Jay Chanoine at Stand Up! Records website

Living people
21st-century American comedians
American stand-up comedians
American male comedians
People from New Hampshire
Comedians from New Hampshire
People from Manchester, New Hampshire
Stand Up! Records artists
1986 births